Qəriblər (also, Gariblar and Gariblyar) is a village and municipality in the Masally Rayon of Azerbaijan at 38°59'51" north of the equator and 48°35'47" east of the Prime Meridian.  It has a population of 1,538..

References

External links

Populated places in Masally District